98 Aquarii (abbreviated 98 Aqr) is a star in the equatorial constellation of Aquarius. 98 Aquarii is the Flamsteed designation, although it also bears the Bayer designation b1 Aquarii. It is visible to the naked eye with an apparent visual magnitude of +3.97. The distance to this star, is known from parallax measurements made with the Hipparcos spacecraft.

With over double the mass of the Sun, this is an evolved giant star that has a stellar classification of K0 III. At the estimated distance of 98 Aquarii, this yields a physical size of about 14 times the radius of the Sun. The expanded outer envelope has an effective temperature of 4,630 K, giving it the orange glow of a K-type star.

References

Aquarii, b1
Aquarii, 098
Aquarius (constellation)
K-type giants
115438
8892
220321
BD-20 6587